The Catchment Management Authorities (CMAs) were established in Victoria under the Catchment and Land Protection Act 1994. Originally known as Catchment and Land Protection Boards, the CMAs were changed to their present name in 1997.

Catchment management authorities are unique because the area they govern corresponds to the naturally occurring drainage basins, enabling integrated catchment management.

Catchment Management Authorities
There are 10 CMAs covering the whole of Victoria, these are divided into a total of 39 river basins (some basins are shared by more than one CMA):

Corangamite
Barwon basin
Corangamite basin
Moorabool basin (part)
Otway basin
East Gippsland
East Gippsland basin
Mitchell basin
Snowy basin
Tambo basin
Glenelg Hopkins
Glenelg basin
Hopkins basin
Portland basin
Goulburn Broken
Broken basin
Goulburn basin
Mallee
Avoca basin (part)
Mallee basin
Wimmera basin (part)
North Central
Campaspe basin
Loddon basin
Avoca basin (part)
Wimmera basin (part)
North East
Kiewa basin
Ovens basin
Upper Murray basin
Port Phillip and Western Port
Bunyip basin
Maribyrnong basin
Moorabool basin (part)
South Gippsland basin (part)
Werribee basin
Yarra basin
West Gippsland
Latrobe basin
South Gippsland basin (part)
Thomson basin
Wimmera
Millicent Coast basin
Wimmera basin (part)

Regional catchment strategies
Every 5 years the CMAs are required under Section 12 of the Act, to produce a regional catchment strategy, which is a statement of how the CMA plans to manage its region over the coming 5 years and is developed with the principles of integrated catchment management. It should cover the condition of the land and water, assess land degradation and prioritise areas for attention, set out a program of works to be undertaken and who will be undertaking the works, specify how the works and land and water condition will be monitored and provide for review of the strategy. The regional catchment strategy can also undertake to provide incentives to landholders, educational programs, research and other services.

See also
 Integrated catchment management
 Catchment management

References

External links
Corangamite Catchment Management Authority website
East Gippsland Catchment Management Authority website
Glenelg Hopkins Catchment Management Authority website
Goulburn Broken Catchment Management Authority website
Mallee Catchment Management Authority website
North Central Catchment Management Authority website
North East Catchment Management Authority website
Port Phillip and Western Port Catchment Management Authority website
West Gippsland Catchment Management Authority website
Wimmera Catchment Management Authority website
 Science week catchment factsheet

 
 *